Mount Kaingaran is a mountain located at the West Coast Division of Sabah, Malaysia.

References 

Kaingaran
Kaingaran
West Coast Division